Micrurus latifasciatus is a species of elapid snake, native to southern Mexico and Guatemala. There are no recognized subspecies.

References 

latifasciatus
Reptiles described in 1933
Snakes of Central America
Reptiles of Guatemala
Reptiles of Mexico